A perennial is a plant that lives for more than two years.

Perennial or perennials may also refer to:

 Perennial, the Gardeners' Royal Benevolent Society, a British charity
 Harper Perennial, a paperback imprint of HarperCollins Publishers
 Perennial (album), by Vera Blue, 2017
 Perennial (terminology), a mindset of a group of people who share common interests
 "Perennials", a song by the American band Bright from their self-titled album

See also

Perennial philosophy, a spiritual philosophy